Bowring Park is located in the Waterford Valley, St. John's, Newfoundland, Canada. Entrance to the park is via Waterford Bridge Road, passing a sculptured duck pond and a Peter Pan statue.

History 

The land that Bowring Park currently occupies was originally a farm owned by William Thorburn known as Rae Island. The land was purchased and donated to the city in 1911 by Sir Edgar Rennie Bowring on behalf of Bowring Brothers Ltd. on their 100th anniversary of commerce in Newfoundland. Frederick Todd created the design and Rudolph Cochius was the landscape architect for the original section of the park. The park was officially opened by His Royal Highness, the Duke of Connaught on July 15, 1914.

The park has expanded to incorporate some of the surrounding areas. In the 1970s the park acquired  of land that once belonged to Sir Richard Squires, known as Midstream. The boundary between the old and new sections of the park is the pedestrian footbridge near the swimming pool. The bridge design and planning for the new section was completed by the noted modernist architect, Blanche Lemco van Ginkel in collaboration with Arup Partners. She presented her designs at the 1959 CIAM congress in Otterlo, Netherlands.

Attractions

The park has many recreation facilities, including tennis courts, a swimming pool and playground. There are a number of statues in the park, including two sculptures by Basil Gotto, one a Caribou and the other The Fighting Newfoundlander. The Caribou is a replica of the monument at the Beaumont-Hamel Newfoundland Memorial Park and was presented to the park by Major William Howe Green, a cousin of Sir Edgar Bowring. The Fighting Newfoundlander, a tribute to the Royal Newfoundland Regiment with Corporal Thomas Pittman as the subject, was also a gift from Sir Edgar Bowring. The statue was unveiled by Sir William Horwood in September 1922.

The statue was unveiled on August 29, 1925 with the following inscription; In memory of a little girl who loved the Park. The building and erection of the statue was supervised by Sir George Frampton, the sculptor who created the original statue at Kensington Gardens, London.

External links
 Bowring Park Foundation

References
 

Parks in St. John's, Newfoundland and Labrador
Bowring Brothers
1914 establishments in Canada